The Paramount Canadians Party was a political party in the Canadian province of Ontario founded in 2011.

Platform

To reduce auto insurance & come to the level of Quebec.
To cap all future insurances premium increase.
To make the federal government agree to provide gas at low prices.
To set up a gas refinery in Ontario under public-private partnership.
To make foreign qualifications from universities of repute acceptable without recourse to long process of accreditation.
To create an appropriate environment to youth to prevent involvement in gangs and drugs etc.
To encourage and strengthen nuclear families.
To rationalize welfare system and also make immigration responsible to provincial needs.
To ensure the seniors lead happy and self reliable life.

Candidates

In the 2011 Ontario general election, the Paramount Canadians Party fielded four candidates for the Legislative Assembly of Ontario

External links
 Paramount Canadian Party on Wayback Machine

References

Provincial political parties in Ontario